The Merrymakers are a Sweden-based music duo composed of Anders Hellgren and David Myhr. Former members are Thomas Nyström, Kenneth Berg, Patrik Bergman and Peter Arffman.  Hellgren and Myhr have been making music together since the 1990s.  Their major releases include Andrew's Store, No Sleep 'Til Famous and Bubblegun.  They have also written and produced songs for Puffy AmiYumi, Dorian Gray, Yuko Yamaguchi and Fujifabric.

In March 2008, Anders Hellgren announced that work had begun on a new Merrymakers album, although this project seemed to be shelved in favor of David Myhr's solo album, Soundshine, released in 2012.

Hellgren and Myhr also play in the ABBA tribute band Super Trouper.

Influences

They have cited the Beatles, ABBA and Depeche Mode as some of their major musical influences.

Discography

Original Swedish Albums
 No Sleep 'Til Famous 9 October 1995, CNR Records
 Bubblegun 26 January 1998, Virgin Records

International Album Versions
 No Sleep 'Til Famous (Japan) 28 April 1997
 Bubblegun (Japan) 27 November 1997
 'Andrew's Store (Japan) 26 September 1997
 Bubblegun (U.S.A.) 9 February 1999

Original Swedish Singles
 "Andrew's Store" / "It's alright" / "I need something" / "Making History" 1992
 "Nobody there" / "I won't let you down" 1993
 "Magic Circles" / "Here for you" 1993
 "Spinning My Mind Away" / "Love (you can make it alright)" 1995
 "Monument of Me" / "Still someone to you" 1995
 "Aeroplane" / "Jetlag" / "Parachute" 1996
 "Monkey In The Middle" / "Coming Home" / "Superstern" / "The Prettiest Star" 26 Nov. 1997
 "Saltwater Drinks" / "Sad" / "Saltwater Drinks" (Remix) 12 Jan 1998
 "April's Fool" / (Hit Vision's radio edit) / (Hit Vision's dance mix) / (Instrumental fool) 1 April 1998

International Singles
 "Monument of Me" / "Parachute" / "Love (you can make it alright)" / "Monument of Me" (Karaoke version) 28 April 1997
 "Smiling In The Sky" (Japanese promotional single) 1997
 "Superstar" / "Superstern" / "Superstar" (karaoke) 1997
 "Troubled times" (American promotion single) 1998
 "No More Lonely Nights" 18 June 2022

Compilations
 Now 6 (Japan) 11 June 1997
 Now 8 (Japan) 24 June 1998

References

External links
 Thomas Nyström
 Official Site
 Official MySpace Page
 Interview at Puffy AmiYumi World
 J-Pop World interview

Swedish indie rock groups
Swedish musical duos